Cory Peoples (born July 23, 1981) is a former professional American and Canadian football safety who is currently the cornerbacks coach of the Georgia Southern University Eagles. He was signed by the Philadelphia Eagles as an undrafted free agent in 2005. He played college football at South Carolina.

Peoples has also been a member of the Toronto Argonauts.

The Philadelphia Eagles announced, in 2012, that as part of the Bill Walsh Minority Coaching Fellowship, the team has hired six interns to the 2012 coaching staff. Correll Buckhalter, William Fuller, Don Holmes, Greg Lewis, Corey Peoples, and Montae Reagor will assist the Eagles staff throughout training camp and the preseason. Five of the six coaching interns spent time with the Eagles during their playing careers in the NFL. "The Bill Walsh Minority Coaching Fellowship is great for getting ex-NFL players and guys from college an opportunity to grow professionally and learn more about coaching,"  said Eagles wide receivers coach David Culley. Culley has been in charge of the hiring the coaching interns since he arrived in Philadelphia in 1999.

On February 19, 2018, Peoples was hired as the cornerbacks coach for the Georgia Southern Eagles football team. He will work under GS head coach Chad Lunsford.

Peoples is currently the defensive backs coach for Georgia Southern University.

References

External links
Toronto Argonauts bio
South Carolina Gamecocks bio

1981 births
Living people
People from Bishopville, South Carolina
American players of Canadian football
Canadian football defensive backs
American football defensive backs
Charleston Southern Buccaneers football coaches
South Carolina Gamecocks football players
Philadelphia Eagles players
Toronto Argonauts players